Economy of America comprises the economy of the United States of America.

Economy of America may also refer to:

 Economy of the Americas, comprises the economies on all sovereign countries located on the American continent
 Economy of North America, comprises the economies of all sovereign countries geographically located in North America, Central America, and the Caribbean
 Economy of South America, comprises the economies of all sovereign countries geographically located in South America